Delbert Loranger (March 17, 1920 – March 24, 2003) was an American professional basketball player and coach.

Career
Loranger played in numerous independent and professional leagues, including the National Basketball League for the Detroit Gems, Indianapolis Kautskys, and Detroit Vagabond Kings. As a player, he averaged 6.8 points per game while in the NBL. Loranger also served as the Vagabond Kings' head coach during the 1948–49 season.

References 

1920 births
2003 deaths
American men's basketball players
Basketball coaches from Michigan
Basketball players from Detroit
Detroit Gems players
Detroit Vagabond Kings coaches
Detroit Vagabond Kings players
Forwards (basketball)
Guards (basketball)
Indianapolis Kautskys players
Player-coaches
Professional Basketball League of America players
Sportspeople from Detroit
Western Michigan Broncos baseball players
Western Michigan Broncos men's basketball players